"Into Ingawe" is a single by South African DJ Sun-El Musician and South African singer Ami Faku, released on  June 7, 2019 by EL World Music.

The song was certified double platinum by the Recording Industry of South Africa (RiSA).

Commercial performance 
The song was certified double platinum by the Recording Industry of South Africa (RiSA).

It peaked at number 7 on Deezer’s Top 10 local tracks in South Africa.

Composition and lyrics 
"Into Ingawe" is a deep house, mid-tempo song, that features influences from Afro beats and dance music on its production. The song was entirely written by Sanele Sithole and Amanda Faku. Lyrically the song is about how an individual's success is dependent upon person's choice to go after it.

Music video 
"Into Ingawe" music video was released on November 21, 2019 on YouTube. It surpassed 1 million views  in the first  3 weeks after its release.

Certifications and sales

Track listing
Digital download and streaming
 "Into Ingawe"  – 4:30

Release history

References

2019 songs